Bounding Home (1941 – February 23, 1947) was an American Thoroughbred racehorse best known as the upset winner of the 1944 Belmont Stakes that deprived Pensive of the U.S. Triple Crown.

Career 
Bred by foodstuffs manufacturer William Ziegler Jr. at his Hickory Tree Stable in Middleburg, Virginia, Bounding Home was conditioned for racing by Matt Brady. At age three he had his best year in racing, winning the Belmont Stakes and notably earning second place in three important handicaps, the Jerome, the Peter Pan, and the Lawrence Realization plus a third in the Travers Stakes to winner and 1944 Champion 3-year-old colt, By Jimminy.

Death 
Bounding Home died suddenly on February 23, 1947, after a workout at Santa Anita.

An avid yachtsman, William Ziegler, Jr. named his 53-foot racing schooner for the horse.

References

 Bounding Home's pedigree and partial racing stats

1941 racehorse births
1947 racehorse deaths
Racehorses bred in Virginia
Racehorses trained in the United States
Belmont Stakes winners
Thoroughbred family 1-k